The Eldest is a 2013–2014 South Korean television series starring Yoon Jung-hee, Jae Hee, Oh Yoon-ah and Park Jae-jung. It aired on JTBC from September 14, 2013 to March 16, 2014.

Synopsis
Set between the 1960s and the 1990s, The Eldest tells the story of five siblings after they lost their parents in an accident. It focuses on Young-sun (Yoon Jung-hee), the eldest sister, who raised her brothers and sisters so they would become successful.

Cast

Main
 Yoon Jung-hee as Kim Young-sun
 Yoo Hae-jung as young Young-sun
 Jae Hee as Park Soon-taek
 Chae Sang-woo as young Soon-taek
 Oh Yoon-ah as Lee Ji-sook
 Roh Jeong-eui as young Ji-sook
 Park Jae-jung as Lee In-ho
 Oh Jae-moo as young In-ho

Supporting

Young-sun's entourage
 Jo Yi-jin as Kim Young-ran
 Kang Eui-sik as Kim Young-doo
 Kim Gyu-sun as Lee Jae-im
 Jung Yoon-hye as Kim Young-sook
 Kim Tae-jin as Kim Young-jae
 Jang Seo-hee as Nan-i

Soon-taek's entourage
 Yoon Yoo-sun as ??
 Lee Dal-hyung as Park Jae-oh
 Hwang Bo-ra as Park Soon-geum

Ji-sook's entourage
 Chang Mi-hee as Yoon Yi-sil
 Jin Hee-kyung as Kim Eun-soon
 Lee Jong-won as Gong Chang-rae
 Kim Byung-se as Lee Sang-nam
 Cho Sung-yoon as Kim Jong-bok
 Lee Hyung-suk as young Jong-bok

Others
 Ra Mi-ran as Na Mi-soon
 Kim Jin-soo as Son Jae-shik
 Kim Soo-mi as Si-deok's mother
 Jun Won-joo as Choi Sa-yeop
 Cha Kwang-soo as Baek-ho
 Jo Yang-ja as Seo Eun-ja
 Kim Jung-kook as Si-deok
 Cha Min-ji as Eun-joo
 Kim Sol as Kim Mal-soon
 Ahn Jae-min as Lee Joon-soo
 Ahn Ji-hye as Na Tan-sil
 Song Ji-ho as Beom-seok

Special appearances
 Goo Bon-im as Mrs. Fang
 Im Hyun-sik as Village mayor
 Lee Yong-yi as Village mayor's wife

Ratings
In this table,  represent the lowest ratings and  represent the highest ratings.

References

External links
  
 

JTBC television dramas
Korean-language television shows
2013 South Korean television series debuts
2014 South Korean television series endings
South Korean historical television series
Television series set in the 1960s
Television series set in the 1970s
Television series set in the 1980s
Television series set in the 1990s
Television series about orphans